Charley Varrick (a.k.a.The Last of the Independents and Kill Charley Varrick) is a 1973 American neo-noir crime film directed by Don Siegel and starring Walter Matthau, Andrew Robinson, Joe Don Baker and John Vernon. Charley Varrick was based on the novel The Looters by John H. Reese and is the first of four consecutive films Matthau appeared in that were not comedies.

Plot
Charley Varrick is a crop-duster and former stunt pilot. Charley, his wife Nadine, longtime accomplice Al Dutcher, and youngster Harman Sullivan, rob a bank in the rural community of Tres Cruces, New Mexico. While Nadine waits in the getaway car, the heavily disguised Charley and his two accomplices draw their guns and begin the heist. A police officer passing by recognizes the getaway car. When the officers approach Nadine, she shoots at them, killing one instantly and seriously wounding the other, but the second officer returns fire, wounding her. The melee outside distracts the robbers, enabling the bank guard to kill Dutcher. Sensing that the bank manager is concealing something, Charley forces him to reveal two large satchels of cash. Charley, Harman, and Nadine flee, but Nadine dies soon thereafter. Charley and Harman swap vehicles and prepare to blow up the getaway car, with Nadine's body inside. They are stopped by another police officer, but before he can search their van, the explosion goes off and the officer races away.

When they count the money, it totals $765,118 — much more than expected. After a local news broadcast reports that only $2,000 was stolen, Charley says the bank must be involved in a money-laundering operation. He warns Harman that the Mafia will pursue them relentlessly and that their only chance of surviving is by laying low and not spending the money for three or four years; however, Harman insists that he should be free to spend his share on women and good times. Meanwhile, Maynard Boyle, president of the bank, dispatches tall, burly, and sadistic hit man Molly to recover the money.

Realizing that Harman's rashness will get them both killed, Charley double-crosses him. Charley knows that he, Nadine, and Harman all had dental work done recently, so he breaks into the dentist's office, stealing his and Nadine's X-rays and swapping Harman's for his. To obtain passports, Charley contacts Tom, an old accomplice of Dutcher, who directs him to local photographer Jewell Everett. He has his photograph taken, but he also gives her Harman's driver's license, thereby ensuring that Molly will find Harman. Tom immediately informs on Charley. Jewell also betrays Charley, but he never returns for the passports. Molly arrives at Charley's trailer and tortures Harman to get information about the money, then beats Harman to death.

Boyle meets secretly with Tres Cruces bank manager Harold Young, advising Young that his Mafia superiors will suspect that the robbery was an inside job, because it occurred during the brief period when the money was there. He suggests that Young will be tortured. Young, terrified, commits suicide.

Charley purchases dynamite, then flies to Reno, where he has flowers delivered to Boyle's secretary, Sybil Fort, so he can identify her and follow her home. He seduces Fort in her apartment. Fort warns Charley not to trust her boss.

Charley then contacts Boyle, offering to return the money. He arranges a meeting at a remote automobile wrecking yard and insists that Boyle come alone. Charley overflies the wrecking yard and spots Molly's car. After landing, Charley hugs the confounded Boyle, acting overjoyed; Molly falls for the ruse and assumes that Boyle is Charley's accomplice, so he runs Boyle down with his car, killing him. Molly then chases Charley, who tries to fly away, but Molly damages the crop-duster's tail with his car and the aircraft flips over. Trapped in the wreckage, Charley tells Molly that the money is in the trunk of a nearby car. However, Charley had flipped his aircraft on purpose. When Molly opens the trunk, he sees Harman's body, wearing Charley's wedding band, and the bank satchels; an instant later, he is killed by a booby trap. Charley throws a wad of hundred-dollar bills toward the burning car, then, after a couple of false starts, drives away.

Cast

 Walter Matthau as Charley Varrick
 Andy Robinson as Harman Sullivan
 Joe Don Baker as Molly
 John Vernon as Maynard Boyle
 Sheree North as Jewell Everett
 Felicia Farr as Sybil Fort
 Norman Fell as Garfinkle
 Woodrow Parfrey as Harold Young
 William Schallert as Sheriff Horton
 Jacqueline Scott as Nadine
 Benson Fong as Honest John
 Marjorie Bennett as Mrs. Taft
 Tom Tully as Tom
 Kathleen O'Malley as Jessie
 Albert Popwell as Randolph Percy
 Bob Steele as Bank Guard (uncredited)
 Don Siegel as Murphy 
 Joe Conforte as himself
 James Nolan as Clerk

Production
Director Don Siegel wanted Varrick's company's motto, "Last of the Independents", to be the title of the film. The motto appears on the film poster and briefly as a subtitle in the film trailer.

When the hit man Molly arrives at Jewell's photo studio and introduces himself, Jewell sarcastically replies, "Yeah, I didn't figure you for Clint Eastwood". The role of Varrick was written for Eastwood, who turned it down, reportedly because he could not find any redeeming features in the character. Matthau was also reported to have been unimpressed by the film, and Siegel later claimed that Matthau hurt the film's box-office by publicly stating that he neither liked the film nor understood what it was about. Matthau sent Siegel a note that said, "I have seen it three times, and am of slightly better than average intelligence (IQ 120) but I still don't quite understand what's going on. Is there a device we can use to explain to people what they're seeing?"

Varrick's aircraft is a converted Boeing PT-17 Stearman Kaydet (N53039) crop-duster flown by Hollywood aerial pilot Frank Tallman. The modified crop-duster belonged to a California agricultural spraying business. This same aircraft crashed in Oakdale, California on December 31, 1976, killing the pilot, who was crop dusting. The plane's wing caught an electric wire and crashed.

Locations
Director Don Siegel filmed several of his movies in northern Nevada, including Charley Varrick, The Shootist and Jinxed! Charley Varrick was set in New Mexico, but was filmed primarily in two small Nevada towns, Dayton and Genoa. Both towns lay a claim to being the oldest towns in the state. The opening bank robbery exterior scenes were filmed in Genoa, at the old Douglas County court house. The sheriff's chase of Varrick and his gang was filmed nearby on Genoa Lane, and on Nevada State Route 207.

The interior bank scenes were filmed in Minden. The trailer park scenes were filmed in Dayton by Hwy 50, at the trailer park, located near the Red Hawk Casino, which was closed in 2008, and the Carson River, at the corner of Hart and Louie Streets. The photographer's studio and gun store scenes were filmed in Gardnerville. The crop duster flight scenes at the conclusion were filmed at the now-closed City Auto Wrecking east of Sparks, near Lockwood Nevada, by Canyon Way Road. The Reno, Nevada filming locations included the Chinese restaurant scenes, filmed at 538 South Virginia Street, and the Arlington Towers condominium building at 100 N. Arlington Avenue. This condo tower is where Varrick meets Miss Fort.

Reception
Although very well received critically, it was a disappointment at the box office. Reviewer Paul Tatara described Charley Varrick as "intelligent, commercial filmmaking at its finest. They rarely make them like this anymore."

Vincent Canby in his review for The New York Times considered Charley Varrick as both an action film and a mystery:
An intelligent action melodrama is probably one of the most difficult kinds of film to make. Intelligence in this case has nothing to do with being literate, poetic, or even reasonable. It has to do with movement, suspense, and sudden changes in fortune that are plausible enough to entertain without challenging you to question basic premises. If you start asking whether such-and-such could really have happened, or if so-and-so would have acted in a certain way, the action film falls apart.

John Simon said Charley Varrick was one of the more accomplished specimens of the gangster genre.

While not strictly a "remake", 2 Guns (2013) has many of its film elements lifted from Charley Varrick.

On Rotten Tomatoes, the film holds a rating of 84% from 25 reviews with the consensus: "With Walter Matthau adding hangdog soul to Don Siegel's propulsive direction, Charley Varrick is a crime thriller that really scores."

Awards
Matthau won the 1974 British Academy of Film and Television Arts Awards for Best Actor in Charley Varrick. In addition, Frank Morriss was nominated for the 1974 British Academy of Film and Television Arts Awards for Best Editing.

Home media
Charley Varrick was released as a Region 1 DVD with no extras on December 28, 2004. On February 14, 2008, the film was released as a Region 2 DVD in Europe in widescreen with some special features. Both DVD versions are uncut. On March 19, 2015, the film was released in a Region B locked Blu-ray in Germany. This edition included a 72 minutes documentary on the making of the film, "Last of the Independents: Don Siegel and the Making of Charley Varrick." On November 12, 2019, the film was released in a Region A locked Blu-ray by Kino Lorber with an exclusive new 4K remaster. This edition includes the "Last of the Independents" documentary, "Refracted Personae", a new video essay with critic Howard S Berger, an archival episode of Trailers from Hell, and a new audio commentary with critic Toby Roan.

Cultural impact
According to Rory Gallagher's long-time bassist Gerry McAvoy, in his book Riding Shotgun: 35 Years on the Road with Rory Gallagher and Nine Below Zero, Gallagher's 1978 song "Last of the Independents" was inspired by Charley Varrick. The logo 'Last of The Independents' appears on the back of Varrick's leather jacket at the beginning of the film when he works as an independent aerial crop sprayer.

See also
 List of American films of 1973

References

Notes

Bibliography

 Davies, Ray. X-Ray: The Unauthorized Autobiography.  New York: The Overlook Press, 1995. .
 McAvoy, Gerry with Pete Chrisp. Riding Shotgun: 35 Years on the Road with Rory Gallagher and 'Nine Below Zero'. Maidstone, Kent, UK: SPG Triumph, 2005. .
 Siegel, Don. A Siegel Film: An Autobiography. New York: Faber & Faber, 1996. .

External links
 
 
 
 Onion AV Club review

1973 films
1970s action thriller films
1970s crime thriller films
1970s heist films
American action thriller films
American aviation films
American chase films
American crime thriller films
American heist films
Films scored by Lalo Schifrin
Films about bank robbery
Films based on American novels
Films directed by Don Siegel
Films set in New Mexico
Films set in Reno, Nevada
Films shot in Nevada
Universal Pictures films
American neo-noir films
1970s English-language films
1970s American films